The 1969 NCAA University Division football season was celebrated as the centennial of college football (the first season being the one in 1869).

During the 20th century, the NCAA had no playoff for the major college football teams, later known as "Division I-A." The NCAA Football Guide, however, did note an "unofficial national champion" based on the top-ranked teams in the "wire service" (AP and UPI) polls.  The "writers' poll" by Associated Press (AP) was the most popular, followed by the "coaches' poll" by United Press International (UPI).  In 1969, the UPI issued its final poll before the bowls, but the AP Trophy was withheld until the postseason was completed.

The AP poll in 1969 consisted of the votes of as many as 45 sportswriters, though not all of them voted in every poll.  Those who cast votes would give their opinion of the twenty best teams.  Under a point system of 20 points for first place, 19 for second, etc., the "overall" ranking was determined.  In 1969, there were four regular season games that matched "Top Five" teams.

This was the last season in which teams were limited to ten games during the regular season; the NCAA allowed eleven starting in 1970.

Rule changes
Cleat lengths are limited to ¾ inch (19 mm).
Batting a lateral pass forward is illegal.
The definition of "roughing the kicker" is clarified.

Conference and program changes
 The Pacific Coast Athletic Association (PCAA, now Big West Conference) began its first season of play in 1969 with seven teams from the state of California.

Prior to the season, the University Division expanded from 114 to 118 teams. The four elevated from the College Division for 1969 were Northern Illinois, San Diego State, Idaho, and Pacific; the latter two were dropped down in 1967.

September
In the preseason poll released on September 15, the defending champion Ohio State Buckeyes were at the top with 26 of the 33 first place votes.  Arkansas was second, followed by Penn State, Texas, and USC.

September 20: No. 1 Ohio State had not yet started its season, and No. 2 Arkansas beat Oklahoma State 39–0 at Little Rock. No. 3 Penn State won 45–22 at Navy, No. 4 Texas won 17–0 at California, and No. 5 USC won 31–21 at Nebraska. The next poll was No. 1 Ohio State, No. 2 Penn State, No. 3 Arkansas, No. 4 Texas, and No. 5 USC.

September 27: No. 1 Ohio State opened its season with a 62–0 dismantling of TCU.  No. 2 Penn State beat Colorado 27–3, and No. 3 Arkansas overpowered Tulsa 55–0. No. 4 Texas won 49–7 over Texas Tech and No. 5 USC beat Northwestern at home 48–6. Rutgers hosted Princeton, just as it had one hundred years earlier on November 6, 1869, the first college football game. In 1869, Rutgers had 6 goals to Princeton's four, and a century later, Rutgers won 29–0.
 The top five remained unchanged in the next poll.

October
October 4: No. 1 Ohio State beat Washington 41–14 at Seattle. No. 2 Penn State narrowly won 17–14 at Kansas State, causing them to drop in the next poll. No. 3 Arkansas beat TCU 24–6 at Little Rock, No. 4 Texas beat Navy 56–17, and No. 5 USC won 31–7 at Oregon State. The next poll was No. 1 Ohio State, No. 2 Texas, No. 3 Arkansas, No. 4 USC, and No, 5 Penn State.

October 11: Several of the top teams played ranked opponents. No. 1 Ohio State beat No. 19 Michigan State 54–21 at home. No. 2 Texas defeated No. 8 Oklahoma 27–17 in their Dallas rivalry game and No. 3 Arkansas was idle. No. 4 USC got past No. 16 Stanford 26–24, and No. 5 Penn State beat No. 17 West Virginia 20–0 at home. The next poll was No. 1 Ohio State, No. 2 Texas, No. 3 USC, No. 4 Arkansas, and No. 5 Penn State.

October 18: No. 1 Ohio State won 34–7 at Minnesota, and No. 2 Texas was idle. No. 3 USC tied No. 11 Notre Dame 14–14 at South Bend. No. 4 Arkansas won 21–7 at Baylor, and No. 5 Penn State narrowly stayed unbeaten at Syracuse, winning 15–14. Two new teams moved ahead of USC and Penn State: No. 6 Missouri won 31–21 over Oklahoma State, and No. 7 Tennessee beat No. 20 Alabama 41–14 in Birmingham. The next poll was No. 1 Ohio State, No. 2 Texas, No. 3 Tennessee, No. 4 Arkansas, and No. 5 Missouri.

October 25: No. 1 Ohio State shut out Illinois 41–0 and No. 2 Texas blanked Rice 31–0 in Austin. No. 3 Tennessee was idle. No. 4 Arkansas beat Wichita State 52–14 in Little Rock. No. 5 Missouri lost at unranked Colorado 31–24, while No. 8 Penn State defeated Ohio University 42–3 and returned to the Top Five. The next poll was No. 1 Ohio State, No. 2 Texas, No. 3 Tennessee, No. 4 Arkansas, and No. 5 Penn State

November
November 1: No. 1 Ohio State won at Northwestern 35–6, and No. 2 Texas beat SMU 45–14 at Dallas. No. 3 Tennessee won 17–3 at No. 11 Georgia, No. 4 Arkansas beat Texas A&M 35–13, and No. 5 Penn State beat Boston College 38–16.  The top five remained unchanged.

November 8: No. 1 Ohio State beat Wisconsin 62–7, and No. 2 Texas beat Baylor 56–14. No. 3 Tennessee beat South Carolina 29–14, No. 4 Arkansas defeated Rice in Houston 30–6, and No. 5 Penn State was idle.  The top five (all of whom had 7−0 records) again remained the same.

November 15: No. 1 Ohio State hosted No. 10 Purdue and won 42–14. By this time, coach Woody Hayes' Buckeyes had outscored their opposition 371–69 and had an 8–0 record with one game left.  No. 2 Texas was comparably dominant, having outscored its opponents 360–76 after beating TCU 69–7 at home to go 8–0. However, No. 3 Tennessee was shut out 38–0 by No. 18 Mississippi in Jackson. No. 4 Arkansas beat SMU 28–15 in Dallas, No. 5 Penn State blanked Maryland 48–0, and No. 6 USC beat Washington 16–7 at Seattle.  In the next poll, Ohio State and Texas stayed at No. 1 and No. 2 for the 7th straight week, each with a 62-point win over their common opponent (TCU, otherwise a 4–4 team). The remainder of the top five was No. 3 Arkansas, No. 4 Penn State, and No. 5 USC.

November 22: After averaging 46 points in its first eight games, No. 1 Ohio State could only manage twelve points at No. 12 Michigan and lost 24–12, ending its 22-game winning streak. In the opening salvo of "The Ten Year War", new coach Bo Schembechler led the Wolverines to the Big Ten championship and a spot in the Rose Bowl. No. 5 USC, aided by a pass interference penalty on fourth down that led to the late game-winning touchdown, closed with a 14–12 win over city rival No. 6 UCLA in a matchup of unbeatens (both 8–0–1) that decided the Pac-8 championship and the other Rose Bowl berth. For the second straight year, the Trojans finished the regular season 9−0−1 with the only blemish being a tie against Notre Dame. No. 2 Texas and No. 3 Arkansas were idle this week, while No. 4 Penn State won 27–7 at Pittsburgh.  In the next poll, Texas took the top spot: No. 1 Texas, No. 2 Arkansas, No. 3 Penn State, No. 4 Ohio State, and No. 5 USC.

November 27−29: In Southwest Conference play on Thanksgiving Day, No. 1 Texas won at Texas A&M 49–12, while No. 2 Arkansas beat Texas Tech 33–0 in Little Rock. Two days later, No. 3 Penn State won 33–8 at North Carolina State and was considered for the Cotton Bowl, where the Southwestern Conference champ (Texas or Arkansas) would go.  Before Ohio State's loss, however, the players had voted to accept a bid to the Orange Bowl, because they preferred going to Miami instead of Dallas.  Certain to move up to No. 2 regardless of how the Texas-Arkansas game came out, Penn State unexpectedly had passed up a chance to go up against the No. 1 team in the nation. Instead, they would face off against No. 6 Missouri, which tied for the Big 8 championship with Nebraska and got the Orange Bowl bid by virtue of a 17−7 victory over the Cornhuskers in October. With No. 4 Ohio State and No. 5 USC having finished their seasons, the top five remained the same going into December.

December
December 6: No. 1 and No. 2 would not meet in a bowl, but faced off at Razorback Stadium in Fayetteville, Arkansas, for the final regular season game for both teams. Both unbeaten at 9–0, No. 1 Texas traveled to meet No. 2 Arkansas for a game to determine the unofficial champion. Among the 44,000 in attendance was President Richard Nixon, who had with him a plaque to award to the "national champion", while an estimated 50 million viewers watched the game on ABC television. After three quarters, Arkansas led 14–0. In the fourth quarter, Longhorns' quarterback James Street couldn't find a receiver and ran 42 yards for a touchdown, then carried over the ball for two to cut the lead to six at 14–8. With 4:47 to play, the Longhorns were on their own 43 on fourth down with three yards to go. Street threw long to Randy Peschel open downfield, who made the catch and fell out of bounds on the 13-yard line. After Ted Koy ran for eleven yards, Jim Bertelsen went over to tie the score, and the extra point kick by Happy Feller gave Texas a 15–14 lead with just under four minutes remaining. A late interception stopped the Hogs and Texas remained undefeated. President Nixon presented the plaque to Texas head coach Darrell Royal after the game.  Because both teams had been unbeaten in Southwest Conference play, the game also determined the SWC championship, with Texas getting the bid for the Cotton Bowl. The final regular season poll was No. 1 Texas, No. 2 Penn State, No. 3 Arkansas, No. 4 Ohio State, and No. 5 USC.

Texas' and Arkansas' bowl opponents were decided under strange circumstances. Arkansas accepted an invitation to the Sugar Bowl, where they would normally have faced either No. 8 LSU or No. 11 Tennessee, the co-champions of the SEC. However, LSU tried instead to arrange a matchup against Texas in the Cotton Bowl, which the school officials viewed as an opportunity to play for the national championship. The negotiations fell through when No. 9 Notre Dame unexpectedly became available. Needing money for scholarships, the Fighting Irish decided to repeal their longstanding policy against appearing in bowl games and offered to become Texas' Cotton Bowl opponent. Meanwhile, the Sugar Bowl organizers spurned LSU and Tennessee in favor of No. 13 Mississippi, which held just a 7−3 record but had dealt both the Tigers and the Volunteers their only loss of the regular season. Tennessee was relegated to the Gator Bowl, while LSU stayed home entirely.

Conference standings

Rankings

Bowl games

Major bowls
Thursday, January 1, 1970

At the Cotton Bowl in Dallas, the No. 1 Texas Longhorns were facing the end of their unbeaten streak before a crowd of 73,000 against No. 9 Notre Dame, playing in its first bowl game in 45 years, since the 1925 Rose Bowl. Trailing 17–14 with 2:26 left in the game, Texas faced a fourth-and-two situation on the Irish ten-yard line. Settling for a tying field goal was out of the question, but a failure to convert would give Notre Dame the ball and the chance to run out the clock.  Texas QB James Street managed to fire a pass over the head of the equally determined linebacker Bob Olson. Cotton Speyrer came down with the ball on the two-yard line, just before the ball hit the ground.  The officials paused before ruling that the pass was indeed complete; on third down from the one, Billy Dale took the ball in for the winning points and, ultimately, the title.

In the final poll after the bowls, the Texas Longhorns were the top choice for 36 of the 45 writers voting, and won the AP Trophy.  The final AP top 20 was: 1.Texas 2.Penn State 3.USC 4.Ohio State 5.Notre Dame 6.Missouri 7.Arkansas 8.Mississippi 9.Michigan 10.UCLA 11.Nebraska 12.Houston 13.LSU 14.Florida 15.Tennessee 16.Colorado 17. West Virginia 18.Purdue 19.Stanford and 20.Auburn.

Other bowls

 Prior to the 1975 season, the Big Ten and Pac-8 conferences allowed only one postseason participant each, for the Rose Bowl.

With its bowl win, No. 11 Nebraska (9–2) ended 1969 on a seven-game winning streak. The Huskers were undefeated in the next two seasons to win consecutive national championships, with an unbeaten streak of 32 games.

Special helmet design
Many schools, at the behest of the NCAA, commemorated the 1969 season by wearing a special decal on their football helmets.  The decal consisted of the numeral "100" inside a football shaped outline.  The decal was designed to commemorate the 1869 game between Rutgers and Princeton, often cited as the first college football game.  Decals varied greatly from one team to another.  Some teams placed the decals unobtrusively on the front or back of the helmet.  Other teams placed them prominently on the side, either in addition to or in place of their regular team logo.  Colors and design of the decals also varied greatly between teams; with different numeral styles and color schemes in use.  One notable exception was Harvard, which abstained from the 1969 commemoration, and had its own special helmet decal made for the 1974 season, which commemorates an 1874 game that Harvard played against McGill that Harvard claims was the "real" first football game.

Awards and honors

Heisman Trophy
Steve Owens of Oklahoma had rushed for 3,867 yards and scored 56 touchdowns in three seasons with the Sooners.  In 1969, he had 29 touchdowns and scored 138 points, and rushed for 248 yards against Iowa State.  Owens was the 19th selection in the 1970 NFL draft and played for the Detroit Lions.  Following him in the Heisman voting were three quarterbacks: Mike Phipps of Purdue, Rex Kern of Ohio State, and Archie Manning of Mississippi. Defensive tackle Mike Reid of Penn State, the Outland Trophy winner, was fifth.

Source:

All-Americans

References